"John Jacob Jingleheimer Schmidt" is a traditional children's song that originates from the United States and Canada. The song consists of one verse repeated (usually four times), each time increasing or decreasing in volume or tempo. If the volume is lowered, the last line ("da da da" or “tra la la la”) often remains constant, shouted even as the rest of the song reduces to a whisper.

Lyrics and melody
There are various lyrics to the song; for example, in the following version, the verse is repeated four times, often while altering the volume or pitch:

Origin
While the origins of the song are obscure, some evidence places its roots with vaudeville and theatre acts of the late 19th century and early 20th century popular in immigrant communities. Some vaudeville acts during the era, such as the work of Joe Weber and Lew Fields, often gave voice to shared frustrations of German-American immigrants and heavily leaned on malapropisms and difficulties with the English language as a vehicle for their humor. "John Jacob Jingleheimer Schmidt" shares many characteristics with "My Name Is Jan Jansen", a song that can trace its origin to Swedish vaudeville in the late 19th century.

The song appears to have already become widely known by the mid-twentieth century. It received a major boost when it was circulated throughout the country during scout troop gatherings in the late 1920s and early 1930s. In 1926, The Times newspaper of Munster, Indiana, printed that, during a Girl Scout outing, the scouts sat around a camp fire and "it was solemnly announced that John Jacob Jingleheimer Smith after a long and useful life had died from overwork on the way to Whiting. He was buried with due ceremony and his ghost is not to be seen until October first. All the favorite camp songs were sung." In 1927, the Portsmouth Daily Times reported that a group of boys from the state YMCA camp sang several camp songs, including "John Jacob Jingleheimer Schmidt." In 1931, Elmira, New York, newspaper the Star-Gazette reported that at a Boy Scout gathering at Seneca Lake, as scouts entered the mess hall, "Troop 18 soon burst into the first camp song, 'John Jacob Jingleheimer Smith'." A 1941 Milwaukee Journal article also refers to the song, with the same alternate title of "John Jacob Jingleheimer Smith."

The song is indefinitely repetitive, in a similar manner to "The Song That Never Ends", "Yon Yonson" or "Michael Finnegan."

Versions of the song appear in other languages, such as the Spanish rendition, "Juan Paco Pedro de la Mar".

Notable appearances

 Daddy Dewdrop released a version of the song titled "John Jacob Jingleheimer Smith" as the B-side to his 1971 single "Chick-A-Boom (Don't Ya Jes' Love It)".
 RocketMan (1997)
 Disney's The Kid (2000)
 Recess: School's Out (2001)
 The Pacifier (2005)
 The Andy Griffith Show episode "Back to Nature" (1964, season 4, episode 31) which again includes Ron Howard in the performance.
 Joel Robinson, Tom Servo and Crow T. Robot frequently sing the song during the Monster a Go-Go episode of Mystery Science Theater 3000.
 Holly Gibney mutters the song as a calming technique for a panic attack in the Mr. Mercedes episode "Bad to Worse" (Season 3, Episode 6).
 In the King of the Hill episode "Peggy's Turtle Song", Peggy Hill asks Bobby "What does that John Jacob Jingleheimer Schmidt do again?", to which Bobby replies, "He goes out, people shout. Not a lot more is known about him."
 Elmo, Prairie Dawn and five kids sing it in the Sesame Street home video Kids' Favorite Songs.

References 

Daddy Dewdrop songs
American children's songs
Canadian children's songs
Traditional children's songs
Songs about fictional male characters
American folk songs